Cyclobacterium marinum  is a bacterium from the genus of Cyclobacterium which has been isolated from coelomic fluid of a sand dollar from the Newport Beach in the United States. "cyclobacterium marinum" produces homospermidine

References

Further reading

External links
Type strain of Cyclobacterium marinum at BacDive -  the Bacterial Diversity Metadatabase	

Cytophagia
Bacteria described in 1976